Weyers Cave School, also known as Weyer's Cave Elementary School, is a historic public school building located at Weyers Cave, Augusta County, Virginia. It was built in 1916–1917, and enlarged in 1923–1924. The original section consists of the northern entrance and hall with four-bay classroom blocks to each side.  It exhibits a central-passage, double-pile plan.  The addition is a four-room and passage block to the south.  The Colonial Revival style is reflected in a one-story, one-bay wooden portico with Doric order columns and square balustrade.

It was listed on the National Register of Historic Places in 1985.

Weyers Cave School was closed as a school in 1993. Presently it is the site of Equipping the Saints, a non-profit organization shipping books, clothing, and technology to third world countries.

References

School buildings on the National Register of Historic Places in Virginia
Colonial Revival architecture in Virginia
School buildings completed in 1917
Schools in Augusta County, Virginia
National Register of Historic Places in Augusta County, Virginia
1917 establishments in Virginia